The men's heavyweight boxing 91 kg boxing event at the 2015 European Games in Baku was held from 16 to 27 June at the Baku Crystal Hall.

Results

Final

Top half

Bottom half

References

External links

Men 91